OnePoll is an international market research agency specialising in PR surveys, consumer insights and opinion polling polling. It has offices in London, Bristol, New York and San Diego. The company is owned by PR and marketing firm SWNS Media Group, which is the UK's largest independent press agency and newswire service. The firm has an online and iPhone panel of over 100,000 Britons ranging across all demographics. Panel members are paid for completing surveys, which typically contain between 10 and 20 questions. OnePoll pay people for participating in surveys, these participants are called Onepolars.

History 
OnePoll was set up to run surveys to aid the PR industry and works for PR agencies including Pegasus PR, Red Consultancy and Ketchum. OnePoll research has been featured in national newspapers, on radio, TV, mobiles and online.

In 2010, OnePoll expanded into research targeted specifically at the marketing and advertising sectors. OnePoll also completed work through a series of specialist demographic panels including MumPoll, YoungPoll, ExecPoll and SilverPoll (for the over-50s). They also expanded into new territories for polling purposes, with panel registration sites being launched in France, Italy, Germany, Spain and the United States.

In 2010, the company moved into mobile polling with the launch of an iPhone app which is available for use in the U.S. and UK.

In 2021, OnePoll along with Vetster published a survey on pet guilt.

Clients 

OnePoll clients include Halifax, Philips, Kelloggs, Virgin Atlantic, Nat West, M&S, Travelodge and range across many industries.

External links 

 OnePoll.com UK Website
 OnePoll.us US Website
 SWNS Media Group - parent company

References 

Companies based in the London Borough of Islington
Public relations companies of the United Kingdom
International marketing research companies
Market research companies of the United Kingdom